Gundis Zámbó (born 5 June 1966 in Gratwein, Styria) is a German actress with Austrian and Hungarian origin.

References 

1966 births
Living people
German television actresses
German people of Hungarian descent
German people of Austrian descent
People from Graz-Umgebung District
20th-century German actresses
21st-century German actresses
Ich bin ein Star – Holt mich hier raus! participants